Jack Walker (28 August 1910 – 9 April 1982) was an Australian rules footballer who played with Geelong in the Victorian Football League (VFL).

From Lara, Walker was a centreman and wingman but could also play as a defender. He was a wingman in Geelong's 1931 premiership team and played all 18 games in 1932. In 1933 and 1934 he again played finals football, appearing in two more preliminary finals. He was also a VFL interstate football representative.

References

External links
 
 

1910 births
1982 deaths
Australian rules footballers from Victoria (Australia)
Geelong Football Club players
Geelong Football Club Premiership players
Lara Football Club players
One-time VFL/AFL Premiership players